Imranullah Aslam (born 14 August 1980) is a Pakistani cricketer who played for Bahawalpur cricket team and Panadura Sports Club.

References

External links
 

1980 births
Living people
Pakistani cricketers
Bahawalpur cricketers
Panadura Sports Club cricketers
Cricketers from Bahawalpur